Shaving is the removal of hair, by using a razor or any other kind of bladed implement, to slice it down—to the level of the skin or otherwise. Shaving is most commonly practiced by men to remove their facial hair and by women to remove their leg and underarm hair. A man is called clean-shaven if he has had his beard entirely removed.

Both men and women sometimes shave their chest hair, abdominal hair, leg hair, underarm hair, pubic hair, or any other body hair. Head shaving is much more common among men. It is often associated with religious practice, the armed forces, and some competitive sports such as swimming, running, and extreme sports. Historically, head shaving has also been used to humiliate, punish, for purification or to show submission to an authority. In more recent history, head shaving has been used in fund-raising efforts, particularly for cancer research organizations and charitable organizations which serve cancer patients. The shaving of head hair is also sometimes done by cancer patients when their treatment may result in hair loss.

History 

Before the advent of razors, hair was sometimes removed using two shells to pull the hair out or using water and a sharp tool. Around 3000 BC when copper tools were developed, copper razors were invented.  The idea of an aesthetic approach to personal hygiene may have begun at this time, though Egyptian priests may have practiced something similar to this earlier. Alexander the Great strongly promoted shaving the beard for Macedonian soldiers before battle because he feared the enemy would grab them. In some Native American tribes, at the time of contact with British colonists, it was customary for men and women to remove all body hair.

Straight razors are known to have been manufactured in Sheffield, England since the 18th century. In the United States, getting a straight razor shave in a barbershop and self-shaving with a straight razor were still common in the early 1900s. The popularisation of self-shaving changed this. According to an estimate by New York City barber Charles de Zemler, barbers' shaving revenue dropped from about 50 percent around the time of the Spanish–American War to 10 percent in 1939 due to the invention of the safety razor and electric razor.

Safety razors have been known to exist since at least 1876 when the single-edge Star safety razor was patented by brothers Frederick and Otto Kampfe. The razor was essentially a small piece of a straight razor attached to a handle using a clamp mechanism. Before each shave the blade had to be attached to a special holder, stropped with a leather belt, and placed back into the razor. After a time, the blade needed to be honed by a cutler.

In 1895, King Camp Gillette invented the double-edged safety razor, which utilised inexpensive, disposable blades sharpened from two sides. It took him until 1901 to build a working, patentable model, and commercial production began in 1903. The razor gained popularity during World War I when the U.S. military started issuing Gillette shaving kits to its servicemen: in 1918, the Gillette Safety Razor Company sold 3.5 million razors and 32 million blades. After the First World War, the company changed the pricing of its razor from a premium $5 to a more affordable $1, leading to another big surge in popularity. The Second World War led to a similar increase in users when Gillette was ordered to dedicate its entire razor production and most blade production to the U.S. military. During the war, 12.5 million razors and 1.5 billion blades were provided to servicemen.

In 1970, Wilkinson Sword introduced the 'bonded blade' razor, which consisted of a single blade housed in a plastic cartridge. Gillette followed in 1971 with its Trac II cartridge razor that utilised two blades. Gillette built on this twin blade design for a time, introducing new razors with added features such as a pivoting head, lubricating strip, and spring-mounted blades until their 1998 launch of the triple-bladed Mach3 razor. Schick launched a four-blade Quattro razor later the same year, and in 2006 Gillette launched the five-blade Fusion. Since then, razors with six and seven blades have been introduced.

Wholly disposable razors gained popularity in the 1970s after Bic brought the first disposable razor to market in 1974. Other manufacturers, Gillette included, soon introduced their own disposable razors, and by 1980 disposables made up more than 27 percent of worldwide unit sales for razors.

Shaving methods 
Shaving can be done with a straight razor or safety razor (called 'manual shaving' or 'wet shaving') or an electric razor (called 'dry shaving') or beard trimmer.

The removal of a full beard often requires the use of scissors or an electric (or beard) trimmer to reduce the mass of hair, simplifying the process.

Wet shaving 
There are two types of manual razors: straight razor and safety razors. Safety razors are further subdivided into double-edged razors, single edge, injector razors, cartridge razors and disposable razors.
Double-edge razors are named so because the blade that they use has two sharp edges on opposite sides of the blade. Current multi-bladed cartridge manufacturers attempt to differentiate themselves by having more or fewer blades than their competitors, each arguing that their product gives a greater shave quality at a more affordable price.

Before wet shaving, the area to be shaved is usually doused in warm to hot water by showering or bathing or covered for several minutes with a hot wet towel to soften the skin and hair. A lathering or lubricating agent such as cream, shaving soap, gel, foam or oil is normally applied after this. Lubricating and moisturizing the skin to be shaved helps prevent irritation and damage known as razor burn. Many razor cartridges include a lubricating strip, made of polyethylene glycol, to function instead of or in supplement to extrinsic agents. It also lifts and softens the hairs, causing them to swell. This enhances the cutting action and sometimes permits cutting the hairs slightly below the surface of the skin. Additionally, during shaving, the lather indicates areas that have not been addressed. When soap is used, it is generally applied with a shaving brush, which has long, soft bristles. It is worked up into a usable lather by the brush, either against the face, in a shaving mug, bowl, scuttle, or palm of the hand.

Since cuts are more likely when using safety razors and straight razors, wet shaving is generally done in more than one pass with the blade.  The goal is to reduce the amount of hair with each pass, instead of trying to eliminate all of it in a single pass.  This also reduces the risks of cuts, soreness, and ingrown hairs.  Alum blocks and styptic pencils are used to close cuts resulting from the shave.

Aftershave 

An aftershave lotion or balm is sometimes used after finishing shaving. It may contain an antiseptic agent such as isopropyl alcohol, both to prevent infection from cuts and to act as an astringent to reduce skin irritation, a perfume, and a moisturizer to soften the facial skin.

Electric shaving 

The electric razor (electric shaver) consists of a set of oscillating or rotating blades, which are held behind a perforated metal screen which prevents them from coming into contact with the skin and behaves much like the second blade in a pair of scissors. When the razor is held against the skin, the whiskers poke through the holes in the screen and are sliced by the moving blades. In some designs the blades are a rotating cylinder. In others they are one or more rotating disks or a set of oscillating blades. Each design has an optimum motion over the skin for the best shave and manufacturers provide guidance on this. Generally, circular or cylindrical blades (rotary-type shaver) move in a circular motion and oscillating blades (foil-type shaver) move left and right. Hitachi has produced foil-type shavers with a rotary blade that operates similarly to the blade assembly of a reel-type lawn mower. The first electric razor was built by Jacob Schick in 1928.

The main disadvantages of electric shaving are that it may not cut the whiskers as closely as razor shaving does and it requires a source of electricity. The advantages include fewer cuts to the skin, quicker shaving and no need for water and lather sources. The initial cost of electric shaving is higher, due to the cost of the shaver itself, but the long-term cost can be significantly lower, since the cutting parts do not need replacement for approximately 18 months and a lathering product is not required. Some people also find they do not experience ingrown hairs (pseudofolliculitis barbae, also called razor bumps), when using an electric shaver.

In contrast to wet shaving, electric shave lotions are intended to stiffen the whiskers.  Stiffening is achieved by dehydrating the follicles using solutions of alcohols and a degreaser such as isopropyl myristate.  Lotions are also sold to reduce skin irritation, but electric shaving does not usually require the application of any lubrication.

Mechanical shavers powered by a spring motor have been manufactured, although in the late 20th century they became rare.  Such shavers can operate for up to two minutes each time the spring is wound and do not require an electrical outlet or batteries.  Such type of shaver, the "Monaco" brand, was used on American space flights in the 1960s and 1970s, during the Apollo missions.

Trimmer 

A trimmer has two adjacent blades, each with teeth on its cutting edge. One blade oscillates alongside a stationary blade so that the teeth cut any hair that falls between them. The main advantage of a trimmer, unlike shaving tools, is that longer beards can be trimmed to a short length efficiently and effectively, including as preparation for shaving.

Effects of shaving

Aberrations 
Shaving can have numerous side effects, including cuts, abrasions, and irritation. Many side effects can be minimized by using a fresh blade, applying plenty of lubrication, shaving in the direction of hair growth, and avoiding pressing the razor into the skin. A shaving brush can also help to lift the hair and spread the lubrication. The cosmetic market in some consumer economies offers many products to reduce these effects; they commonly dry the affected area, and some also help to lift out the trapped hair(s). Some people who shave choose to use only single-blade or wire-wrapped blades that shave farther away from the skin. Others have skin that cannot tolerate razor shaving at all; they use depilatory shaving powders to dissolve hair above the skin's surface, or grow a beard. Some anatomical parts, such as the scrotum, require extra care and more advanced equipment due to the uneven surface of the skin when the testicles shrivel during coldness, or its imbalance when the testicles hang low due to being warmer.

Cuts 
Cuts from shaving can bleed for about fifteen minutes. Shaving cuts can be caused by blade movement perpendicular to the blade's cutting axis or by regular / orthogonal shaving over prominent bumps on the skin (which the blade incises). As such, the presence of acne can make shaving cuts more likely, and extra care must be exercised. The use of a fresh, sharp blade as well as proper cleaning and lubrication of skin can help prevent cuts. Some razor blade manufacturers include disposal containers or receptacles to avoid injuries to anyone handling the garbage.

Razor burn 

Razor burn is an irritation of the skin caused by using a blunt blade or not using proper technique. It appears as a mild rash 2–4 minutes after shaving (once hair starts to grow through sealed skin) and usually disappears after a few hours to a few days, depending on severity. In severe cases, razor burn can also be accompanied by razor bumps, where the area around shaved hairs get raised red welts or infected pustules.
A rash at the time of shaving is usually a sign of lack of lubrication. Razor burn is a common problem, especially among those who shave coarse hairs on areas with sensitive skin like the bikini line, pubic hair, underarms, chest, and beard. The condition can be caused by shaving too closely, shaving with a blunt blade, dry shaving, applying too much pressure when shaving, shaving too quickly or roughly, or shaving against the grain.

Ways to prevent razor burn include keeping the skin moist, using a shaving brush and lather, using a moisturizing shaving gel, shaving in the direction of the hair growth, resisting the urge to shave too closely, applying minimal pressure, avoiding scratching or irritation after shaving, avoiding irritating products on the shaved area (colognes, perfumes, etc.) and using an aftershave cream with aloe vera or other emollients. Putting a warm, wet cloth on one's skin helps as well, by softening hairs. This can also be done by using pre-shave oil before the application of shaving cream. Essential oils such as coconut oil, tea-tree oil, peppermint oil, and lavender oil help to soothe skin after shaving. They have anti-inflammatory, antiseptic, and antibacterial properties.

In some cases multi-bladed razors can cause skin irritation by shaving too close to the skin. Switching to a single- or double-bladed razor and not stretching the skin while shaving can mitigate this.

One other technique involves exfoliating the skin before and after shaving, using various exfoliating products, included but not limited to, brushes, mitts, and loofah. This process removes dead skin cells, reducing the potential for ingrown hairs and allowing the razor to glide across the skin smoothly decreasing the risk of the razor snagging or grabbing causing razor burn.

Razor bumps 

Pseudofolliculitis barbae is a medical term for persistent inflammation caused by shaving. It is also known by the initials PFB or colloquial terms such as razor bumps.

Myths 
Shaving does not cause terminal hair to grow back thicker, coarser or darker. This belief arose because hair that has never been cut has a naturally tapered end as it emerges from the skin's hair follicle, whereas, after cutting, there is no taper. The cut hair may thus appear to be thicker, and feel coarser as a result of the sharp edges on each cut strand. The fact that shorter hairs are "harder" (less flexible) than longer hairs also contributes to this effect. Hair can also appear darker after it grows back because hair that has never been cut is often lighter from sun exposure.  In addition, as humans grow older hair tends to grow coarser and in more places on the face and body.  For example, teenagers may start shaving their face or legs at around 16, but as they age hair will start to grow more abundantly and thicker, leading some to believe this was due to the shaving, but in reality is just part of the maturation process.

Shaving in religion

Hinduism, Buddhism, Jainism and Christianity 

Hindu, Jain and Buddhist (usually only monks or nuns) temples have ceremonies of shaving the hair from the scalp of priests, nuns, and certain followers, as a symbol of their renunciation of worldly fashion and esteem.  Amish men and some other plain peoples shave their beard until they are married, after which they allow it to grow but continue to shave their mustaches. Tonsure is the practice of some Christian churches.

In Hinduism, in certain communities, a child's birth hair is shaved off as part of a set of religious rites (samskaras)

Islam

Sunni 
Shaykh Ibn ‘Uthaymeen said: The definition of the beard as stated by the scholars of (Arabic) language is: the hair of the face, jawbone and cheeks, in the sense that all the hair on the cheeks, jawbone and chin is part of the beard and removing any of it is counted as a sin, because the Messenger said: “Let your beards grow,” “Leave your beards alone,” “Let your beards increase,” “Let your beards be full.” This indicates that it is not permissible to remove anything from the beard. However, Ibn Omar, a companion of the Prophet Muhammad, used to cut from his beard anything that outgrew a fist’s length.

Shia 
According to the Shia scholars, the length of beard should not exceed the width of a fist. Trimming of facial hair is allowed, however, shaving it is Haram (forbidden).

Judaism 

Observant Jewish men are subject to restrictions on the shaving of their beards, as Leviticus 19:27 forbids the shaving of the corners of the head and prohibits the marring of the corners of the beard. The Hebrew word used in this verse refers specifically to shaving with a blade against the skin; rabbis at different times and places have interpreted it in many ways.

Tools like scissors and electric razors, which cut the hair between two blades instead of between blade and skin, are permitted.

See also 
Androgenic hair
 Barber
 Beard
 Beard Liberation Front
 Burma-Shave
 Cutting
 Hair removal
 Head shaving
 Leg shaving
 List of facial hairstyles
 Pogonotomia, the art of shaving
 Fraternal Order of Police v. City of Newark
 Pubic hair
 Shaving cream
 Shaving soap

References

Bibliography

Further reading 
 Ham, Michael (2012). “Leisureguy’s Guide to Gourmet Shaving, 6th edition: Shaving Made Enjoyable,” Pogonotomy Press. 

 
Facial hair